Blanca "Blanquita" Heredia Osío (1 April 1934 – 17 December 2022) was a Venezuelan pageant titleholder who won Miss Venezuela 1956 and was the official representative of Venezuela to the Miss Universe 1956 pageant held in Long Beach, California, United States, on 20 July 1956, when she qualified in the Top 15 semifinalists.

Heredia died on 17 December 2022, at the age of 88.

References

External links
Miss Venezuela Official Website
Miss Universe Official Website

1934 births
2022 deaths
Miss Universe 1956 contestants
Miss Venezuela winners
People from Caracas